Tony Reading was a British art director. He was nominated for an Academy Award in the category Best Art Direction for the film Ragtime.

Selected filmography
 Ragtime (1981)

References

External links

Year of birth missing (living people)
Living people
British art directors